Kuch Ankahi is a Pakistani television series written by Syed Mohammad Ahmed and directed by Nadeem Baig. It is produced by Kashf Foundation in collaboration with Six Sigma Plus. The lead cast include Sajal Aly and Bilal Abbas Khan in their third on-screen appearance. It first aired on 7 January 2023.

Cast 
Main cast:
 Sajal Aly as Aaliya Agha
 Bilal Abbas Khan as Salman
 Sheheryar Munawar as Asfar Motiwala

Aaliya's household:
 Mohammad Ahmed as Agha Jaan, Aaliya's father
 Irsa Ghazal as Sama, Aaliya's mother
 Mira Sethi as Samiya Agha, Aaliya's older sister
 Qudsia Ali as Tania Agha, Aaliya's younger sister
 Vaneeza Ahmad as Sofia Agha, Agha Jaan's younger sister
 Adnan Samad Khan as Shakeel, Agha Jaan and Sofia’s nephew
 Moona Shah as Mina, housemaid of Aaliya's house

Salman's household:
 Annie Zaidi as Almas, Salman's mother

Asfar's household:
 Alina Abbas as Sehrish Motiwala, Asfar's step-sister
 Yousuf Bashir Qureshi as Asfar and Sehrish's father

Additional cast:
 Babar Ali as Thanvi, Sofia's ex-fiance
 Asma Abbas as Zareena, Samiya's mother in law
 Ali Safina as Saif ur Rahman, Samiya's fiance
 Uroosa Siddiqui as Saif ur Rahman's girlfriend
 Mohammed Ehteshamuddin
 Abdullah Abid Malik as Ali, Tania's friend
 Emaan Khan as Neha, Mina's daughter
 Saqib Sumeer as Mina's husband
 Falak Shahzad as Deepak, Mina's son
 Hammad Farooq as Parmesh, Mina's nephew
 Shabir Murad as Munawar, Agha Jaan's lawyer
 Musaddiq Malek as Rafiq, Salman's business partner

Production 
In July 2021, the head of Kashf Foundation Roshaneh Zafar revealed that they are developing the concept for her next serial, that will be lighter in mood and with it she hopes to revive the days of Ankahi and Tanhaiyaan. She further revealed that it will address the themes such as population boom, reproductive health of women, domestic violence and family planning. On 11 August 2022, Khan revealed on his Instagram account about his next project which was tentatively titled Kashf, a production of Six Sigma Plus. Later, Galaxy Lollywood reported that Aly will star opposite Khan in the series which will be directed by Nadeem Baig and written by Syed Mohammad Ahmed. Thus, it marked Aly and Khan's third on-screen together appearance after O Rangreza (2017) and feature film Khel Khel Mein (2021). In November, the official title of series Kuch Ankahe was revealed. In conservation with DAWN Images, Sethi revealed that the plot revolves around three sisters, and their aspirations; the release date of the series was also revealed.

The first look of the series was unveiled on 23 December 2022.

Soundtrack 
The original soundtrack of the show was composed by Azaan Sami Khan, who also performed it and lyrics by Syed Mohammad Ahmed.

Reception

Television rating points (TRPs)

Critical reception 
DAWN Images praised the light heartedness and subtle messaging in the series.

References 

ARY Digital original programming
Pakistani television series
Urdu-language television shows